Best Baby Father is the fourth album released by Shabba Ranks.

Track listing

References

1991 albums
Shabba Ranks albums